August Bromeis, a landscape painter, who was born at Wilhelmshöhe in 1813, first studied in the academy of his native town, then at Munich,
from 1831 to 1833, in which year he went to Rome, where he was much influenced by the style of J. A. Koch. Bromeis returned to Germany in 1848, and
resided at Frankfurt am Main and Düsseldorf, and at Cassel, where he was made Instructor and Professor of Painting at the Academy in 1867. He died at Cassel in 1881. His most successful pictures were idealized landscapes, for example:

The Campagna at Rome (in the Town Gallery at Cassel).
Italian Landscape, 1869 (in the National Gallery at Berlin)
The Grave of Archimedes in Sicily.
Stormy Landscape.
Forest near Düsseldorf.

He is associated with the Düsseldorf school of painting.

See also
 List of German painters

References
 

1813 births
1881 deaths
19th-century German painters
German male painters
German landscape painters
19th-century German male artists
Artists from Kassel
Düsseldorf school of painting